Carl Tacy (June 18, 1932 – April 2, 2020) was a college basketball coach at Wake Forest University in North Carolina. He served as the head coach from 1972 to 1985 and compiled a 222–149 record, the second-most winning record at that time. Tacy's Demon Deacons defeated DePaul 73–71 in overtime in the NCAA Midwest Regional semifinals at St. Louis Arena on March 23, 1984 in the final game of Ray Meyer's coaching career. In 1985, he was inducted into the Wake Forest Hall of Fame. From 1971 to 1972, he served as the head basketball coach at Marshall University, where he compiled a 23–4 (.852) record.

Head coaching record

References

1932 births
2020 deaths
Basketball coaches from West Virginia
Basketball players from West Virginia
College men's basketball head coaches in the United States
Davis & Elkins Senators men's basketball players
Ferrum Panthers men's basketball coaches
High school basketball coaches in the United States
Junior college men's basketball coaches in the United States
Marshall Thundering Herd men's basketball coaches
People from Randolph County, West Virginia
Wake Forest Demon Deacons men's basketball coaches